The 2017 J.League Cup (2017 Jリーグカップ), or officially the 2017 J.League YBC Levain Cup (2017 JリーグYBCルヴァンカップ), was the 42nd edition of the most prestigious Japanese football league cup tournament and the 25th edition under the current J.League Cup format.

Format

Teams from the J.League Division 1 will take part in the tournament. Teams that qualified for 2017 AFC Champions League group stage (3 or 4 teams: later confirmed as Gamba Osaka, Kashima Antlers, Kawasaki Frontale and Urawa Red Diamonds) were given byes to the quarter-finals. The remaining teams (14 or 15 teams) started from the group stage, where they were divided into two groups of 7 or 8 teams. The group winners of each group were to qualify for the quarter-finals. The remained quarter-finalists (2 or 3 teams) were to be the winners of the play-off of the following two-legged ties:
 If 3 teams automatically qualified for the quarter-finals due to the participation in AFC Champions League:
 Group A runners-up v. Group B fourth place
 Group A third place v. Group B third place
 Group A fourth place v. Group B runners-up
 If 4 teams automatically qualified for the quarter-finals due to the participation in AFC Champions League:
 Group A runners-up v. Group B third place
 Group A third place v. Group B runners-up

Group stage

Group A

Standings

Results

Group B

Standings

Results

Play-off stage

|}

Quarter-finals

|}

Semi-finals

First leg

Second leg

Final

Top scorers
.

References

J.League Cup
2017 in Japanese football